Malakhovo is a rural locality in Kamyshinsky Selsoviet Rural Settlement, Kursky District, Kursk Oblast, Russia. Population:

Geography 
The village is located in the Tuskar River basin (a right tributary of the Seym), 109 km from the Russia–Ukraine border, 13 km north-east of the district center – the town Kursk, 8 km from the selsoviet center – Kamyshi.

 Streets
There is Novaya Street and 76 houses.

 Climate
Malakhovo has a warm-summer humid continental climate (Dfb in the Köppen climate classification).

Transport 
Malakhovo is located 14 km from the federal route  Crimea Highway (a part of the European route ), on the road of regional importance  (Kursk – Ponyri), 1 km from the nearest railway halt 521 km (railway line Oryol – Kursk).

The rural locality is situated 14 km from Kursk Vostochny Airport, 138 km from Belgorod International Airport and 201 km from Voronezh Peter the Great Airport.

References

Notes

Sources

Rural localities in Kursky District, Kursk Oblast